Coalville, Montana, also known as Gebo, Montana, was a community by the Gebo Mine, in Carbon County, Montana near Fromberg, Montana.

"Coalville (historical)" is a "Locale", identified as GNIS number 1726660 in the Geographic Names Information System, at elevation . It had a railroad station (per GNIS number 1726660) and a post office, the "Coalville Post Office" (per GNIS number 1726661).

The mine was developed by Samuel Gebo. It attracted the Northern Pacific Railway to build a railroad line up the Clarks Fork Valley, on the Clarks Fork of the Yellowstone River.

It was the location of a boardinghouse operated by Hester E. Suydam, before she tried to have it moved to Fromberg, Montana. It was destroyed in a wind storm. The Hester E. Suydam Boarding House, a new building she had built in Fromberg, is listed on the National Register of Historic Places.

See also
Gebo, Wyoming, a ghost town near another mine developed by Samuel Gebo

References

Former populated places in Carbon County, Montana